Milmyeon (meaning "wheat noodle") is a noodle dish that originated in Busan, South Korea. Milmyeon is a variant of the North Korean noodle dish naengmyeon. It consists of wheat noodles in a cold meat broth (mul milmyeon) or a spicy sauce (bibim milmyeon), and topped with vegetables and garnish.

Naengmyeon is a North Korean dish that is based on noodles containing buckwheat flour. During the Korean War, many Northerners fled to the South. Buckwheat was scarce in Busan, so Northern refugees made somyeon noodles with wheat flour provided by American food rations. The new version of the dish was called milmyeon, meaning "wheat noodle". Milmyeon has become a specialty of Busan.

The basic recipe includes noodles made from wheat flour and potato (or sweet potato) starch, and meat broth enriched with vegetables and medicinal herbs.

Milyeon comes in two basic varieties. In Mul milmyeon, the noodles are served in an icy-cold broth and topped with pickled garnishes. Bibim milmyeon is made with a spicy, gochujang-based paste.

References 

Culture of Busan
Korean noodles
Korean noodle dishes
Noodle soups
Cold noodles